The 2004–05 OHL season was the 25th season of the Ontario Hockey League. The OHL inaugurated two awards for scholastic achievement, the Roger Neilson Memorial Award and the Ivan Tennant Memorial Award. Twenty teams each played 68 games. The London Knights set a Canadian Hockey League record, being undefeated in 31 games. On March 11, 2005, the league announced OHL Live Stream, a new streaming service to be developed over a three year period. The J. Ross Robertson Cup was won by the London Knights, defeating the Ottawa 67's.

Regular season

Final standings
Note: DIV = Division; GP = Games played; W = Wins; L = Losses; T = Ties; OTL = Overtime losses; GF = Goals for; GA = Goals against; PTS = Points; x = clinched playoff berth; y = clinched division title; z = clinched conference title

Eastern conference

Western conference

Scoring leaders

Playoffs

Conference quarterfinals

Eastern conference

Western conference

Conference semifinals

Conference finals

J. Ross Robertson Cup finals

J. Ross Robertson Cup Champions Roster

All-Star teams

First team
Jeff Carter, Centre, Sault Ste. Marie Greyhounds
Dylan Hunter, Left Wing, London Knights
Corey Perry, Right Wing, London Knights
Danny Syvret, Defence, London Knights
Andre Benoit, Defence, Kitchener Rangers
Michael Ouzas, Goaltender, Mississauga IceDogs
Dale Hunter, Coach, London Knights

Second team
Mike Richards, Centre, Kitchener Rangers
Benoit Pouliot, Left Wing, Sudbury Wolves
Bobby Ryan, Right Wing, Owen Sound Attack
Jordan Smith, Defence, Sault Ste. Marie Greyhounds
Kyle Quincey, Defence, Mississauga IceDogs
Adam Dennis, Goaltender, London Knights
Dick Todd, Coach, Peterborough Petes

Third team
Brad Richardson, Centre, Owen Sound Attack
Liam Reddox, Left Wing, Peterborough Petes
Ryan Callahan, Right Wing, Guelph Storm
Nathan McIver, Defence, Toronto St. Michael's Majors
Mark Flood, Defence, Peterborough Petes
Gerald Coleman, Goaltender, London Knights
Mike Stothers, Coach, Owen Sound Attack

CHL Canada/Russia Series
In the ADT Canada-Russia Challenge:
On November 25, the OHL All-stars defeated the Russian Selects 3–1 at Barrie, Ontario.
On November 28, the OHL All-stars defeated the Russian Selects 5–2 at Mississauga, Ontario.

After these two games, OHL had an all-time record of 4–0 against the Russian Selects since the tournament began in 2003–04.

Awards

London Knights' 2004–05 undefeated streak
In the 2004–05 season the London Knights broke an OHL record, going 28 games in a row without a loss (27–0–1). They subsequently broke the CHL record of 29 games (held by the 1978–79 Brandon Wheat Kings, who went 25–0–4 during their streak), with a 0–0 tie with the Guelph Storm on December 10, 2004, giving them a record of 28–0–2. The streak ended at 31 games after a 5–2 loss to the Sudbury Wolves on December 17.

*Tied OHL record previously set by Kitchener in 1983–84 
**Broke OHL record previously set by Kitchener in 1983–84
***Tied CHL record previously set by Brandon in 1978–79
****Broke CHL record previously set by Brandon in 1978–79

2005 OHL Priority Selection
On May 7, 2005, the OHL conducted the 2005 Ontario Hockey League Priority Selection. The Oshawa Generals held the first overall pick in the draft, and selected John Tavares from the Toronto Marlboros. Tavares was awarded the Jack Ferguson Award, awarded to the top pick in the draft.

Below are the players who were selected in the first round of the 2005 Ontario Hockey League Priority Selection.

2005 CHL Import Draft
On June 29, 2005, the Canadian Hockey League conducted the 2005 CHL Import Draft, in which teams in all three CHL leagues participate in. The Ottawa 67's held the first pick in the draft by a team in the OHL, and selected Jakub Vojta from the Czech Republic with their selection.

Below are the players who were selected in the first round by Ontario Hockey League teams in the 2005 CHL Import Draft.

See also
List of OHA Junior A standings
List of OHL seasons
2005 Memorial Cup
2005 NHL Entry Draft
2004 in sports
2005 in sports

References

HockeyDB

Ontario Hockey League seasons
OHL